Letuka Nkole is a member of the Pan-African Parliament from Lesotho.

References

Members of the Pan-African Parliament from Lesotho
Living people
Year of birth missing (living people)
Place of birth missing (living people)